The men's 5000 metres at the 2007 All-Africa Games were held on July 22.

Results

References
Results

5000